Depot Battalion Royal Engineers F.C. was an English football club. In 1908 the club joined Division Two the Southern League. That season they finished third in the league and won the FA Amateur Cup, defeating Stockton 2–1 in the final. However, they left the league at the end of the season.

References

Defunct football clubs in England
Association football clubs disestablished in 1909
Southern Football League clubs
1909 disestablishments in England
Defunct football clubs in Kent
Military football clubs in England